Smithfield Historic District is a national historic district located at Smithfield, Isle of Wight County, Virginia. It encompasses 289 contributing buildings and 2 contributing structures in the historic downtown and surrounding residential areas of Smithfield.  There are  211 houses, 37 commercial buildings, 1 warehouse, 4 churches, 10 barns, 1 smokehouse, 23 garages, 1 farm office, 1 colonial kitchen, and 2 corncrib structures.  Notable buildings include the original county clerk's office (1799), county jail, Wentworth-Barrett House (c. 1752), Wentworth–Grinnan House (c. 1780), King-Atkinson House (c. 1800), Smith-Morrison House (1770s), Hayden Hall (c. 1810, c. 1846), Boykin House (c. 1876), Goodrich House (1886), Thomas House (1889), Smithfield Academy (1827), Christ Episcopal Church (1832, 1892), and Hill Street Baptist Church (1923). Located in the district and separately listed are the Old Isle of Wight Courthouse, Smithfield Inn, Windsor Castle Farm, and P. D. Gwaltney Jr. House.

It was listed on the National Register of Historic Places in 1973.

References

External links
Isle of Wight County Courthouse, Main & Mason Streets, Smithfield, Isle of Wight County, VA: 3 photos at Historic American Buildings Survey
Barrett House, South Church Street, Smithfield, Isle of Wight County, VA: 5 photos and 2 data pages at Historic American Buildings Survey
Grove Hotel, Mason Street, Smithfield, Isle of Wight County, VA: 3 photos at Historic American Buildings Survey
Small Brick Office, Mason & Main Streets, Smithfield, Isle of Wight County, VA: 1 photo at Historic American Buildings Survey
Mason's Hall, Mason Street, Smithfield, Isle of Wight County, VA: 1 photo and 5 data pages at Historic American Buildings Survey

Historic districts on the National Register of Historic Places in Virginia
Buildings and structures in Isle of Wight County, Virginia
National Register of Historic Places in Isle of Wight County, Virginia